Granville Harbour Wind Farm is a wind farm operated by Palisade Investment Partners, on the west coast of Tasmania, Australia.  

The facility first generated to the grid on 27 February 2020 with the completion of its first turbine, with the site being fully commissioned and operational in December 2020.  The wind farm has 31 wind turbines and have a maximum capacity of 112 MW.

Operations 
The generation table uses eljmkt nemlog to obtain generation values for each month. Grid connection started in January 2020, and was fully commissioned in December 2020.

Note: Asterisk indicates power output was limited during the month.

See also 
 Wind power in Australia

References

External links
 Granville Harbour Wind Farm website

Wind farms in Tasmania
Western Tasmania